The Muskogee Hotel, at 26 W. Broadway St. in Muskogee, Oklahoma, was listed on the National Register of Historic Places in 2019. It was listed as Hotel Muskogee.

It was built during 1922-1923 and opened in 1923.

It later became apartments for low-income residents. It was ordered closed by the city in 1992 due to disrepair, and it was in fact closed in 1996. It fell further into disrepair during subsequent years.

It is located on the northeast corner of West Broadway and North Main Street in Muskogee.

References

Hotels in Oklahoma
National Register of Historic Places in Muskogee County, Oklahoma
Buildings and structures completed in 1923